L'Argentera is a village in the province of Tarragona and autonomous community of Catalonia, Spain.

Notable people
 Maria Teresa Cabré (born 1947), linguist

References

External links
 Government data pages 

Municipalities in Baix Camp